THES may refer to:

Times Higher Education Supplement (now Times Higher Education), a weekly British magazine based in London
Toronto Hydro Electric System, the local distributor of electric power in the City of Toronto
Twin Hickory Elementary School, an elementary school in Henrico County, Virginia

See also 
Thes, a genus of beetles
 1 Thes., an abbreviation for the First Epistle to the Thessalonians, a book of the Bible
 2 Thes., an abbreviation for the Second Epistle to the Thessalonians, a book of the Bible